The Ultimate Book Guides are an award-winning series of reading guides for children and teenagers. The guides are edited by Leonie Flynn, Daniel Hahn, and Susan Reuben and published in the U.K. by A&C Black. The reading guides comprise book recommendations written by children's authors and illustrators including Jacqueline Wilson, Terry Pratchett, Quentin Blake, Susan Cooper, and Dick King-Smith.

There are three titles in the series: The Ultimate Book Guide (for 8-12s), first published in 2004, with an introduction by Anne Fine; The Ultimate Teen Book Guide, published in 2006 (2008 in the U.S.) with an introduction by David Almond; and The Ultimate First Book Guide, published in 2008, with an introduction by Julia Donaldson. The Ultimate Book Guide won the 'Best Book with Facts' category prize in the 2004 Blue Peter Book Awards.

See also
Readers' advisory

References 

Books of literary criticism
Children's non-fiction books
A & C Black books